Oglebay Hall is a historic classroom building associated with the West Virginia University and located at Morgantown, Monongalia County, West Virginia. It was built in 1918, and is a three-story, brick and concrete building with Classical Revival detailing. The front facade features four Doric order columns that support a pediment with a false, concrete railing and entablature with the building's name.  It also has balconies with cast iron balustrades.  It originally housed the university's College of Agriculture (until 1961) and represents the university's heritage as a land-grant institution. The building is named for industrialist and philanthropist Earl W. Oglebay, whose house at Wheeling, West Virginia is known as the Oglebay Mansion Museum.

It was listed on the National Register of Historic Places in 1985.

References

West Virginia University campus
University and college buildings on the National Register of Historic Places in West Virginia
Neoclassical architecture in West Virginia
School buildings completed in 1918
National Register of Historic Places in Monongalia County, West Virginia
1918 establishments in West Virginia